Elachista cretula is a moth species in the family Elachistidae. It was described by Lauri Kaila in 2011. It is found in Kazakhstan and Turkmenistan.

The wingspan is 10.5–11.5 mm. The forewings are creamy white, suffused with pale grey and brown scales and the basal third of the costa is narrowly grey. The hindwings are grey, with paler yellowish grey fringe scales.

References

Moths described in 2011
cretula
Moths of Asia